Esterase D may refer to:
 Methylumbelliferyl-acetate deacetylase, an enzyme
 Carboxylesterase, an enzyme